Chen Qian (born 14 January 1987 in Suzhou, Jiangsu) is a female Chinese modern pentathlete who competed in the 2008 Summer Olympics in Beijing and the 2012 Summer Olympics in London finishing in 5th place on both occasions.

She won the gold medal in the individual event at the 2009 World Modern Pentathlon Championships.

She competed in the 2016 Summer Olympics coming in fourth place. However Chen was disqualified for doping. She was suspended for 4 years and retired from the sport

References

 BEIJING 2008 OLYMPIC GAMES CHINESE SPORTS DELEGATION ROSTER

External links
 

1987 births
Living people
Chinese female modern pentathletes
Modern pentathletes at the 2008 Summer Olympics
Modern pentathletes at the 2012 Summer Olympics
Modern pentathletes at the 2016 Summer Olympics
Olympic modern pentathletes of China
Sportspeople from Suzhou
Asian Games medalists in modern pentathlon
Modern pentathletes at the 2010 Asian Games
Modern pentathletes at the 2014 Asian Games
World Modern Pentathlon Championships medalists
Asian Games gold medalists for China
Asian Games bronze medalists for China
Medalists at the 2010 Asian Games
Medalists at the 2014 Asian Games
20th-century Chinese women
21st-century Chinese women